Karabakh Revival Fund  is a public legal entity, established by the president of Azerbaijan, Ilham Aliyev, on January 4, 2021.

Structure 
The current management of the Fund's activities is carried out by the management board consisting of three members—the Chairman and his two deputies. Funds are formed from donations of individuals and legal entities, grants and other sources not prohibited by law. The head of state also signed an order approving the composition of the supervisory board of the Karabakh Revival Foundation. According to the order, the following composition of the supervisory board of the so-called Karabakh Revival Foundation was approved:.

Supervisory board 
 Mikayil Jabbarov, Minister of Economy of the Republic of Azerbaijan
 Mukhtar Babayev, Minister of Ecology and Natural Resources of the Republic of Azerbaijan
 Rovshan Rzayev, Chairman of the State Committee for Refugees and Internally Displaced Persons of the Republic of Azerbaijan
 Tural Ganjaliyev, Chairman of the Public Union of the Azerbaijani Community of Nagorno-Karabakh, Member of the Milli Majlis of the Republic of Azerbaijan
 Fatma Yildirim, Deputy of the Milli Majlis of the Republic of Azerbaijan
 Farhad Badalbeyli, Rector of the Baku Music Academy
 Adalat Muradov, Rector of the Azerbaijan State University of Economics Kamal Abdulla - Rector of the Azerbaijan University of Languages
 Alim Gasimov, People's Artist of the Republic of Azerbaijan.

Board of directors 

 Rahman Haji, chairman of the Board

Department directors 
 Aybaniz Ismayilova, Head of Fundraising and Communications Department

External links 
 Official Website

References 

Foundations based in Azerbaijan